The 1961 World Men's Handball Championship was the fourth team handball World Championship. It was held in West Germany between 1–12 March 1961. A united team composed of players from the German Democratic Republic and the Federal Republic of Germany competed. Romania won the championship.

Final standings

Standings

Preliminary round

GROUP A

GROUP B

GROUP C

GROUP D

Main Round

GROUP 1

GROUP 2

Final matches

Source: International Handball Federation

World Handball Championship tournaments
H
H
World Men's Handball Championship
World Men's Handball Championship